The term English Martyrs is applied to two groups of people executed by either side of the English Reformation. See:

List of Catholic martyrs of the English Reformation
Forty Martyrs of England and Wales (canonised)
One Hundred and Seven Martyrs of England and Wales (beatified)
List of Protestant martyrs of the English Reformation

English Martyrs may also refer to the following Catholic schools and churches:
English Martyrs Catholic School, Leicester
English Martyrs School and Sixth Form College, Hartlepool
English Martyrs Church, Preston (full name "Church of St Thomas of Canterbury and the English Martyrs")
English Martyrs' Church, Wallasey, Merseyside
 English Martyrs Church, Tower Hill, London

English Reformation